NEMO (from "NEw MOrtar") is a single barrelled 120 mm remote-controlled mortar turret currently being developed by Patria Land Oy in Finland. It is a lighter version of the AMOS mortar system, which has been in use within the Finnish Defence Forces since 2013. The NEMO can be fitted to most APCs and also to smaller landing craft, such as the Finnish Jurmo-class landing craft or the Swedish CB90-class fast assault craft.

History
The first customer of the weapon system was the Slovenian Army, which ordered 12, while the United Arab Emirates Naval Forces bought 12 patrol boats, where some were to be equipped with NEMO mortars. Saudi Arabia bought 36 turrets to equip its LAV II vehicles. Recently, Patria is offering the NEMO system fitted into standardised 20-ft-containers to increase flexibility: the mortar container can be lifted with and fired from a truck or a boat or can be set on the ground, e.g. as base defense. Training simulators are also available.

Operators

  – See AMOS.
  – Operated by the Saudi Arabian National Guard.
  – Mounted on the Patria AMV.
  – See AMOS.
  – Integrated on naval platforms.

See also
Light-weight Combat Vehicle System
AMOS
M120 Rak

References

External links
Manufacturer's website
NEMO 120-mm Self-Propelled Mortar System, article by Military Today

120mm mortars
Gun-mortars
Mortars of Finland